Stampede in the Night is a 1916 American short Western film directed by Jacques Jaccard.

Cast
 Hoot Gibson
 Olive Carey credited as Olive Fuller Golden
 Neal Hart
 William Canfield
 Peggy Coudray

See also
 Hoot Gibson filmography

External links
 

1916 films
1916 Western (genre) films
1916 short films
American silent short films
American black-and-white films
Films directed by Jacques Jaccard
Silent American Western (genre) films
1910s American films